The Hashtag Initiative or simply # Initiative (NTH) is a centrist anti-corruptionist political movement in Albania was founded after the student protests of 2018, by a group of young intellectuals, and is led by a young lecturer and activist, Dr. Endrit Shabani. In 2019 leaders of Nisma, Dr. Shabani, Panajot Soko, Erion Kristo and Mirush Kabashi toured the country demanding a series of constitutional amendments discussed in Charter 2020. Following its success in changing the Electoral code in 2020, they registered in the Parliamentary Election of 2021, becoming as the most popular anti-establishment political group in the country. Their political Manifesto (Charter 2020) is underpinned by three pillars: 1) equal opportunities for progress 2) participatory democracy 3) national solidarity

History 
Nisma Thurje is a grassroots movement in Albania. It was founded after the student protests of 2018, by a group of young intellectuals, academics, doctors, engineers, lawyers and journalists. Nisma is led by a young lecturer and activist, Dr. Endrit Shabani, who has stated that the driving motivation of the founders has to fight inequality and the concentration of power, as well as to promote national solidarity among Albanians. The founders of Nisma were worried about the outcomes of heightened concentration of power and wealth in Albania, which has produced deep social divisions and threatens the long economic and political stability of the country. In one interview, Dr. Shabani, has stated that "we took an early decision not to fall for the trick of the agenda-setting game, which takes the attention away from the real issues facing the random citizen nowadays and focuses all the nation’s eyes on the whims of a one or two people who live disconnected from the very people they pretend to represent". 
Very soon Thurje turned into the most popular grass-roots movement of young people, organizing various massive protests mounting pressure on corrupted politicians holding them accountable to their constituencies. It is worth mentioning that Nisma has shown a constructive approach, proposing a better solution to the issue they raise, managing to bring forward several legal initiatives, some of which have turned into laws and bylaws, and even amendments to the Albanian Constitution. Their legal initiative to change the electoral system, which was supported by 50’000 voters and managed to mount a very high public pressure over political parties, leading to the amendment of the constitution of Albania on 30th July 2020. 
This initiative encouraged them to take a step further and on 28th November 2020 they announced our intention to seek political representation in Parliament and City Councils. From 2021 Nisma Thurje has been officially recognised by the Tirana District Court and the Central Electoral Commission as eligible to run for seats in parliament and city councils. Subsequently, on 24th of April Nisma Thurje participated in the general election, receiving 10’217 votes all over Albania. The leader of the party has been Dr. Endrit Shabani, but the first candidate in the list was another founder of Nisma, Panajot Soko, a renowned economist and political activist in Albania.

Elections
At the 2021 parliamentary election the party ran for the first time, with a national list.

References 

Political parties in Albania